Below is a list of radio stations in Davao Region in the Philippines, whose coverage is in part or whole of the same.

Metro Davao

Davao Occidental

FM Stations

Davao Oriental

FM Stations

Davao del Norte

AM Stations

FM Stations

Davao del Sur

AM Stations

FM Stations

Davao de Oro

FM Stations

References

Davao